Daniel Jacobus Snoeks (born 12 July 1994) is an Australian model, television personality and tattooist, who lives and performs in Vancouver, Canada. He was a cast member in the talk show Non-Summit. In October 2014, Snoeks hosted Saturday Night Live Korea.

Daniel founded Le Papillon Studios in 2020.

Personal
Born to a Dutch father and a Papua New Guinean mother, Snoeks started Taekwondo when he was 4 years old.

Filmography

Television series

Music video appearances

References

External links

1994 births
Living people
Tattoo artists
Australian male models
Australian television personalities
Australian expatriates in South Korea
Australian people of Dutch descent
Australian people of Papua New Guinean descent